The Cramp Twins is an animated television series created by cartoonist Brian Wood based on his 1995 graphic novel of the same name. The show was produced by Sunbow Entertainment (in season 1), Telemagination (in season 2), and TV-Loonland AG, in association with Cartoon Network Europe.

Overview

The series follows the adventures of Lucien Cramp (Kath Soucie) and Wayne Cramp (Tom Kenny), fraternal twin brothers who live with their germophobic mother Dorothy (Nicole Oliver) and their Western-obsessed father Horace (Ian James Corlett) in the fictional town of Soap City. Wayne and Lucien's personalities clash, and they rarely get along. Wayne has a friend called Dirty Joe (Lee Tockar), who owns a dump, and neighbour Wendy Winkle (Jayne Peterson) has a crush on him, but he hates her. Wayne's and Lucien's teacher is Miss Hillary Hissy (Cathy Weseluck). Lucien's friends include environment-friendly Tony Parsons (Terry Klassen) and geeky Mari Phelps (Tabitha St. Germain).

Two seasons of The Cramp Twins were made altogether. In the United States, season 1 aired as two separate seasons, and did not get broadcast until long after it had aired in its home country. All episodes were aired 2–3 years earlier in the UK leaving one episode from season 2 (4 in the US) unaired.

Characters

Main
 Wayne Cramp (voiced by Tom Kenny) is the blue-skinned younger of the twins, but is taller than Lucien. Wayne is energetic, egotistical, manipulative, rude and descriptive, and the less intelligent of the two. He is also the bully of their class and feared by most kids. Wayne is obsessed with junk, which he collects and hides in his room; he spends most of his time at the junkyard, owned by his only friend, Dirty Joe Muldoon. Unlike Lucien, who loves the swamp, Wayne is terrified of the place, and also has a fear of frogs. Wayne's only love is anything sugary, his main source of energy, and if he is deprived from it, he becomes tired and speaks nonsense. Apart from sweet stuff, he also likes fast-food. He is also shown to be a self-taught mechanical genius in various episodes, like building an entire "Road-Ready Drag Racer" out of his bed, turning his bed into a trampoline, welding together various junk to create an Egyptian-style temple or taking good care of the Junkyard when Joe's out of town. He is shown to have a softer side when he creates his own imaginary brother out of an old arcade board after being banned from playing with Lucien.
 Lucien Cramp (voiced by Kath Soucie) is Wayne's older twin brother, as the opening credits indicate. Lucien is the smarter of the twins, and is considered an "eco-nerd." Despite being the older twin, Lucien is the favorite target of Wayne's bullying nature, and Wayne frequently refers to him with the nickname "Girl Pants". Lucien enjoys science, nature and is a vegetarian. Lucien longs for a pet, either a cat, a dog, or a hamster, but due to his mother's extreme cleanliness rules, he cannot have one. To combat this, Lucien secretly keeps a worm farm under his bed, that only Tony, Mari, Wayne and Wendy know about; his mom and dad are unaware that he has it. It is shown in many episodes that Lucien has a fear of clowns. He has many skills, including knitting, and has shown interest in playing the harp. Lucien likes going to Soap City's only swamp (the only place he gets peace from Wayne, who is afraid of the place) where Tony lives. Lucien is often seen trying to promote environmental awareness, usually through protesting against the environmentally unfriendly products or activities rife in Soap City. However, due to the disinterest or, in some cases, dislike many of its residents have towards nature (and especially the swamp), these attempts are almost always ignored, belittled or ridiculed; he is frequently teased by other children. He has a crush on Tony's mom as shown in one episode.
 Dorothy Cramp (née O'Neil) (voiced by Nicole Oliver), is the yellow-skinned short-tempered, strict mother to the twins, and wife of Horace Cramp. She is a complete germaphobe and neat freak. Her obsession for cleanliness is a major source of comedy in the show. She once raided the twins' rooms and husband's storage to check their cleanliness, which resulted in her kicking them out of the house due to Wayne's junk, Lucien's mud for his worms, and Horace's Rodeo Rita picture. She is something of a scientist by way of cleaning products, for she often mixes home-made cleaning formulas to seek out the strongest germ-killer, which seems to awaken her twisted desire to clean everything "to the brim". This is described by Horace as having "The Cleanies" and happens every once in a while which results in everyone preparing for shelter because she always desires to test it on them first "for safety". She has a crush on fellow clean-freak Agent X, who is suspected by Lucien to be an alien and is a frequent fuel of jealousy for Horace.
 Horace Cramp (voiced by Ian James Corlett) is the green-skinned and dim-witted man-child father of Wayne and Lucien and husband of Dorothy Cramp. He works at the local soap and cleaner products factory. He is also a third-rate cowboy, being obsessed with pretty much anything Western-oriented, including "cowgirl" Rodeo Rita, much to his wife's disapproval. He is always fruitlessly trying to impress his boss, Mr. Winkle, although is quite incompetent, and hated by his mother-in-law. By the second season his cowardice has almost completely disappeared as a result of Wayne's attempt to use him as a source of income in one episode.
 Tony Parsons (voiced by Terry Klassen) is Lucien's best friend (although they have been known to fall out) and a swamp child. He possesses a vast knowledge about the swamp, its people's traditions, and natural history. He has many brothers and sisters. Tony's dad's name is Seth and his mom's is Lily. Tony is extremely short (about a half metre tall) and finds it hampers his day-to-day life, e.g. riding a bicycle, but uses equipment to aid him, e.g. he wears a flag-meet-helmet whilst riding his specially-designed bike so other road users can see him. Apart from this, Tony's height doesn't seem to effect his self-esteem. As his father also used to be very short, it can be presumed that Tony is also going to grow taller. He and Mari are Lucien's only friends in the show. A running gag in the show is Tony's belief in supernatural things, like magic and aliens. Lucien often tries to argue against Tony's beliefs, using vague scientific facts, though Lucien always ends up standing corrected.
 Wendy Winkle (voiced by Janice Kawaye under the pseudonym Jayne Paterson) is the only daughter of Walter Winkle. Wendy is a bubbly but very spoiled, narcissistic, and psychotic brat who has an insane obsession with Wayne. Because of her immense wealth she has a tendency to get her way and bullies pretty much anyone, even her own parents. Throughout the series, she tries everything to win Wayne's heart, yet is always unsuccessful, even going so far as spying on him to kidnapping him. However, she seems to exhibit an attraction to even Lucien sometimes, but she always ends up backing away from it in the end, with little regard to what happened and why.
 Mari Phelps (voiced by Tabitha St. Germain) is Lucien's other friend. She often co-operates with Lucien on his environment-conserving efforts, but often can't help desiring a bit of power. She is a foster child and is looked after by a happiness-obsessed, brown-haired family with strange mormonist based customs. She is the black sheep of her foster family and is often embarrassed by their habits. Lucien briefly had a crush on Mari when she felt sorry for him during a time he felt certain he would never have a girlfriend, but nothing came of it. However, they remain good friends.

Recurring
 Dirty Joe Muldoon: (voiced by Lee Tockar) A dim-witted, lonely, middle-aged man who owns the local junkyard frequented by Wayne. He is Wayne's best and only friend. He is an unseen character (except for a hand and part of his clothes). According to one episode, he had never bathed or showered in his life, and he showers for the first time in his life when he comes to live with the Cramps.
 Walter Winkle: (voiced by Colin Murdock) Mr Cramp's boss and Wendy's father. He owns the city's soap-producing factory. He is a very unlikable man who practically owns the town, since many of the residents work for him and don't dare to cross him. It is hinted in many episodes that he is in fact a swamp person and that he and Mr Parsons knew each other as children. The reason why he doesn't disapprove of his daughter's toxic influence over him is often regarded as a desire for her not to hate him which could result in a falling out that will guarantee his loneliness, which is why he frequently asks for other people to solve his problems regarding her.
 Hillary Hissy: (voiced by Cathy Weseluck) Hillary (Miss Hissy) is Wayne's, Lucien's, Wendy's and Mari's oversized teacher. She hates children and is a friend of Dirty Joe. They were thought to be dating once, but it turned out she was only tutoring him. Miss Hissy has also been shown to have a crush on Horace Cramp (Wayne and Lucien's father) and Mr Winkle. She is very unlikeable and her teaching methods usually involve bullying her students. Her catch-phrase is "tout de suite". In one episode it is revealed that she is a karate expert. She owns a long stick with hammered bottle caps on it (called 'The Crank') and threatens students into behaving by shaking it in an aggressive manner.
 Seth Parsons: (voiced by Terry Klassen) Tony's father and a swamp person. He and the Parson family live near the swamp. His wife is Lily (who did not appear until later episodes). In the 3rd episode, "The Bad Seed", it is shown that, in the western era, he was the outlaw Bad Seed's sidekick Little Hat in his childhood; at the time, he was very short, and he resembled his future son Tony. Little Hat wore a cowboy outfit and has a hat that covers his head.
 Mr. Pretty: (voiced by Jay Brazeau) is the overly peppy principal of the school introduced in the second season, whose methods to an extent annoy the Cramps. He is often quick to blame Miss Hissy for his own incompetence.
 Lillian "Lilly" Parsons: (voiced by Pauline Newstone) Seth's wife and the mother of Tony and his siblings. Lucien once had a crush on her, much to Tony's annoyance.
 Mrs. Phelps (Voiced by Kath Soucie): Mari's mother. She is the strictest member of the family.
 Mr. Phelps: Mari's dad. He works at the opticians. Voiced by Colin Murdock.
Agent X: A mysterious and charismatic character portrayed as an FBI Agent (or similar). He has neat, black hair, and always wears a black suit, a white shirt, and a black tie. He appears to have an obsession for cleanliness, like Dorothy, who has a crush on him because of this, and because she likes his deep voice.

Minor
 Mrs. Winkle: (voiced by Cathy Weseluck) Wendy's mother and Walter Winkle's wife. She behaves more or less like her husband, but ignores/denies the fact they're related to Swamp People.
 Barber: Dorothy takes Lucien and Wayne to see him, and due to a number of circumstances, ends up shutting down his shop entirely. He appears to dislike and to be scared of Tony, as Tony did not pay his hair shaving fees.
 Rodeo Rita: (voiced by Kath Soucie) A bull rider and country yodeler who turns out to be a fraud. Horace is a big fan of hers, and has a crush on her; the revelation did almost nothing to affect his opinion of her.
 Big Baby: The boys' unnamed female cousin. Although she is five years old, she can barely speak or walk. According to Dorothy, she "puts all her energy into growing". She is also shown to be very strong, smart and manipulative, as she manages to get away with using the twins as piggy back rides, or in her case "ponies". She outwits the twins after they try to tell on her and prove her mischief, but she was exposed by the end of the episode.
 Marsha and Tandy: Dorothy's so-called friends. Marsha is voiced by Ellen Kennedy and Tandy is voiced by Iris Quinn. They are often seen arguing or insulting each other and often take delight in Dorothy's domestic misfortunes (i.e. Wayne and/or Lucien embarrassing her, behaving in an unsanitary manner, etc.).

Production and development
On April 1, 1999, the series was announced to be planned as a co-production with Sunbow Entertainment and Cartoon Network Europe during the development of their first co-production Fat Dog Mendoza. In July of that year, the production of the series was announced.

In October 2000, Sony Wonder's TV arm was acquired by German company TV-Loonland AG, putting The Cramp Twins under the control of Loonland.

On March 6, 2001, TV-Loonland AG pre-sold the British terrestrial rights to the series to the BBC. In September 2001, the series was pre-sold in Germany to KI.KA. By Late 2001, the series pre-sold to TF1 in France., and TV-Loonland subsidiary Salsa Distribution pre-sold the series in Latin America to Fox Kids.

In October 2002, it was announced that the series would be renewed for a second season, and that the animation production would be taken over from Sunbow Entertainment to Telemagination, a British animation company that TV-Loonland owned. By then, it was also announced that the series had been picked up in over 50 countries worldwide.

Broadcast
The Cramp Twins premiered in the United Kingdom on September 3, 2001 on Cartoon Network and on BBC One during the CBBC programming block, later airing on the CBBC channel itself in February 2002. The show achieved high popularity with children in the UK, pulling in 1.5 million viewers a week on CBBC and becoming the top-rated weekend series on Cartoon Network during its initial broadcast. Although the series ended, reruns continued to air on CBBC and Cartoon Network for a few years afterwards, with Cartoon Network airing the show well into the mid-2010s at night, in order to fill European content requirements alongside Skatoony and Robotboy. It was also repeated on Boomerang UK and Cartoon Network Too.

On January 30, 2003, it was announced that 4Kids Entertainment had acquired the exclusive merchandise licensing, television broadcast and home video rights for the series within the United States. The series premiered in the country on the company's FoxBox Saturday morning block on Fox on February 8, 2003. It would continue to air on the block at various intervals until August 19, 2006. The series also aired on Cartoon Network in the US from June 14, 2004 to April 2005.

In Canada, the series aired on YTV, premiering in 2004.

Home media

United Kingdom
In the UK, the series was released on DVD (with Volume 1 also released on VHS) by Metrodome Distribution, a home video company that TV-Loonland AG majority-owned at the time. Volumes 4 and 5 were released under the distributor's "Mini Metro" budget range.

All episodes released on DVD in the country made up the entirety of Series 1. Volume 5 also includes a Season 2 episode.

"Sick Daze / Picket Picket" was also featured on a compilation VHS and DVD called "Boys Stuff" from 2004 which also featured episodes from The Transformers, G.I. Joe: A Real American Hero, Yvon of the Yukon and Super Duper Sumos.

United States
In the United States, two DVDs containing 11 segments each were released on DVD by Platinum Disc and 4Kids Home Video.

The first: "Twin-Compatible", was released on April 19, 2005, and the other: "Twin-Sult" was released on March 10, 2006.

Ratings
 Wednesday 20 February 2002 - 60,000 (2nd most watched on CBBC that week)
 Friday 15 March 2002 - 40,000 (8th most watched on CBBC that week)
 Thursday 21 March 2002 - 40,000 (3rd most watched on CBBC that week)
 Thursday 28 March 2002 - 60,000 (most watched on CBBC that week)
 Tuesday 26 March 2002 - 40,000 (6th most watched on CBBC that week)
 Monday 15 April 2002 - 30,000 (4th most watched on CBBC that week)

Award nominations
 BAFTA Children's Awards 2002
 Nominated for Best Animation

References

External links
 
 

2000s American animated television series
2001 American television series debuts
2006 American television series endings
2000s British animated television series
2001 British television series debuts
2006 British television series endings
2000s Canadian animated television series
2001 Canadian television series debuts
2006 Canadian television series endings
2001 German television series debuts
2006 German television series endings
American children's animated comedy television series
British children's animated comedy television series
Canadian children's animated comedy television series
German children's animated comedy television series
English-language television shows
BBC children's television shows
Cartoon Network original programming
Television series by Sunbow Entertainment
Animated television series about twins
American television shows based on children's books
British television shows based on children's books
Canadian television shows based on children's books